Larry Nathaniel Kimbrough (September 23, 1923 – January 29, 2001), nicknamed "Schoolboy", was an American Negro league pitcher in the 1940s. A rare switch pitcher, he played for the Philadelphia Stars and the Homestead Grays.

A native of Philadelphia, Pennsylvania, Kimbrough graduated from Benjamin Franklin High School, where he starred on the school's baseball team, tossing a no-hitter in 1941. A natural left-hander, he learned to throw right-handed as a child while recuperating from an injury.  Kimbrough played in the Negro leagues from 1942–44, and again in 1946 after returning from WWII.  Records are fragmentary, but it is believed he pitched only 16 innings over his career, as well as playing in the outfield in several games.  No independent accounts have verified that Kimbrough operated as a switch pitcher during his Negro League career, but Kimbrough himself claims that he earned a complete game victory in 1943 pitching from both sides.  (Other accounts verify his pitching win, but not that he used both arms as a pitcher in that specific game.) The Society for American Baseball Research identifies Kimbrough as having been on the roster of the 1948 Homestead Grays, but there does not appear to be a record of Kimbrough appearing in a regular season game for the club (although he did appear in a few exhibition games.)

Kimbrough served in the US Army during World War II, and died in Philadelphia in 2001 at age 77.

References

External links
 and Seamheads
Larry Kimbrough at Negro League Baseball Museum
Larry Kimbrough biography from Society for American Baseball Research (SABR)

1923 births
2001 deaths
Philadelphia Stars players
Homestead Grays players
20th-century African-American sportspeople